John Austin (20 June 1871 – 2 November 1956) was a Barbadian cricketer. He played in two first-class matches for the Barbados cricket team in 1905/06.

See also
 List of Barbadian representative cricketers

References

External links
 

1871 births
1956 deaths
Barbadian cricketers
Barbados cricketers
People from Saint Philip, Barbados